Niederglatt is a railway station in the Swiss canton of Zurich and municipality of Niederglatt. It is located on the Bülach branch of the Bülach-Regensberg Railway and served by Zurich S-Bahn line S9.

Niederglatt was the junction for the former Niederglatt-Otelfingen railway line, which once connected with Otelfingen station on the Furttal line but closed to through trains in 1937. The first  of the line, from Niederglatt as far as the Tanklager Mettmenhasli, has been retained as a siding, and joins the main line just to the south of the station.

References

External links 

Niederglatt station on Swiss Federal Railway's web site

Niederglatt
Niederglatt